Alberto Mancini won in the final 7–5, 2–6, 7–6, 7–5 against Boris Becker.

Ivan Lendl was the defending champion but did not compete this year.

Seeds
A champion seed is indicated in bold text while text in italics indicates the round in which that seed was eliminated. All sixteen seeds received a bye to the second round.

  Mats Wilander (semifinals)
  Boris Becker (final)
  Kent Carlsson (withdrew)
  Jakob Hlasek (second round)
  Jimmy Connors (second round)
  Henri Leconte (second round, retired)
  Emilio Sánchez (second round)
  Guillermo Pérez Roldán (quarterfinals)
  Jonas Svensson (third round)
  Ronald Agénor (quarterfinals)
  Slobodan Živojinović (second round)
  Andrei Chesnokov (second round)
  Horst Skoff (semifinals)
  Alberto Mancini (champion)
  Mark Woodforde (second round)
  Jordi Arrese (third round)

Draw

Key

Finals

Top half

Section 1

Section 2

Bottom half

Section 3

Section 4

External links
 1989 Monte Carlo Open draw

1989 Monte Carlo Open